Visitors to Mali must obtain a visa from one of the Malian diplomatic missions unless they come from one of the visa exempt countries.

Visa policy map

Visa exemption 
Citizens of the following countries and territories can visit Mali without a visa:

Holders of diplomatic and service category passports of Brazil, China, Cuba, Russia and Rwanda do not require a visa for 90 days. Nationals of any country with a diplomatic and service passports do not require a visa for up to 1 month. Nationals of China holding passports for public affairs do not require a visa for a maximum stay of 90 days.

Visa exemption agreement for diplomatic, service, official passports was signed with South Africa but not yet ratified.

Visa on arrival

Nationals of the following 2 countries may apply for a visa on arrival for a maximum stay of 3 months. Up until 9 March 2015, many countries were also eligible for visa on arrival:

Syria

Entry and transit is refused to  nationals, even if not leaving the aircraft and proceeding by the same flight.

Visitor statistics
Most visitors arriving to Mali for tourism purposes were from the following countries of nationality:

See also

Visa requirements for Malian citizens

References

Foreign relations of Mali
Mali